Bay Terrace is the name of a neighborhood, centered around the street of the same name, on the East Shore of Staten Island, one of the five boroughs of New York City. It is represented in the New York City Council by Joe Borelli.

Bay Terrace is bordered by Richmondtown to the north, Oakwood to the east, Great Kills to the west, and the Great Kills Harbor to the south.

History

Formerly known as Whitlock, the community's main thoroughfare was originally named Bay Terrace Avenue; however, by the late 1940s the word "Avenue" had been dropped and the street's name became simply Bay Terrace.  The vicinity around the street was largely undeveloped until the late 1950s, when single-family home construction began there; the area itself then acquired the name of Bay Terrace, which may refer to its flat, ramp like terrain, which gradually slopes downward to the east until reaching the Lower New York Bay in Great Kills Park.

In the 1970s many Jewish families from Brooklyn and Queens settled in Bay Terrace, providing a significant demographic contrast with the surrounding communities, whose populations are still largely Italian-American, though they are becoming increasingly Russian-American as well.  In recent years, many new commercial establishments — most notably a large shopping center built on the site of a former swim club — have sprung up to serve the area's growing population.  Part of Oceanview Cemetery, originally established by the Lutheran Church but open to those of all faiths, is considered to be in Bay Terrace, which is regarded by many Staten Island geographers as the southernmost neighborhood of the East Shore,  the South Shore beginning with Great Kills, which lies immediately to the south.

Famous residents
Guy Molinari, an American politician who was a member of the New York State Assembly and the United States House of Representatives. He also served as Staten Island Borough President from 1989–2001.

Ron Thal, a hard rock guitar player who is a former member of Guns N' Roses lived in the area from his childhood through his mid 20s.

Transportation

Bay Terrace is served by the Staten Island Railway station with the same name. Bay Terrace is also served by various buses along Hylan Boulevard. It is served by the  local buses, as well as the  express buses.

References

Neighborhoods in Staten Island